Ernest Murray Pollock, 1st Viscount Hanworth, KBE, PC (25 November 1861 – 22 October 1936), was a British Conservative politician, lawyer and judge. He served as Master of the Rolls from 1923 to 1935.

Background
Pollock was born in Wimbledon, the fifth son of George Frederick Pollock, grandson of Sir Frederick Pollock, 1st Baronet, Lord Chief Baron of the Court of Exchequer. He was educated at Charterhouse School and Trinity College, Cambridge, graduating in 1883. He was called to the bar by the Inner Temple in 1885.

Political and legal career
Pollock sat as Member of Parliament for Warwick and Leamington from 1910 to 1923. In 1919, under David Lloyd George, he was appointed Solicitor General which he remained until 1922, when he became Attorney General, but left this post the same year. He was appointed to the Privy Council in the 1922 New Year Honours and was created a baronet later the same year. He left the House of Commons at the 1923 general election, and was replaced in his seat by Anthony Eden. The same year he was made Master of the Rolls. On 28 January 1926 he elevated to the peerage as Baron Hanworth, of Hanworth in the County of Middlesex. He resigned as Master of the Rolls in 1935. The following year he was further honoured when he was made Viscount Hanworth, of Hanworth in the County of Middlesex, on 17 January 1936.

Family
Lord Hanworth married Laura Helen Salt (1865–1954), daughter of banker and politician Thomas Salt, in 1887. They had a son and daughter, Marjorie Laura, who married (Sir) Walter Leslie Farrer, solicitor to George VI. He died at his home in Hythe, Kent, in October 1936, aged 74. He was succeeded in the viscountcy by his grandson David Pollock, 2nd Viscount Hanworth, his son Charles Thomas Anderdon Pollock (d. 1918) having been killed in the First World War.

Arms

Footnotes

References 
Dictionary of National Biography: Pollock, Ernest Murray

External links

 
 

|-

Hanworth, Ernest Pollock, 1st Viscount
Hanworth, Ernest Pollock, 1st Viscount
Conservative Party (UK) MPs for English constituencies
Hanworth, Ernest Pollock, 1st Viscount
Hanworth, Ernest Pollock, 1st Viscount
Members of the Judicial Committee of the Privy Council
Solicitors General for England and Wales
Attorneys General for England and Wales
UK MPs 1910
UK MPs 1910–1918
UK MPs 1918–1922
UK MPs 1922–1923
UK MPs who were granted peerages
Masters of the Rolls
Members of the Inner Temple
People from Wimbledon, London
People educated at Charterhouse School
Alumni of Trinity College, Cambridge
Barons created by George V
Viscounts created by George V
1